Giorgio Simonelli (14 November 1901 – 3 October 1966), was an Italian film director, editor, screenwriter and journalist.

Life and career
Born in Rome, Simonelli obtained a high school diploma in business studies, then he started working as a journalist, and even as a film critic, for the weekly magazines Avvenimento and Gente nostra. In 1928, at 22, he made his directorial debut co-directing with Nicola Fausto Neroni Maratona and two years later he was among the screenwriters of the first Italian talking film, The Song of Love by Gennaro Righelli.  From 1934 Simonelli mainly devoted himself to the film editing, then, since 1940, he reprised his activity as a director specializing in comedy films of great commercial success, in which he directed some of the more popular actors of the period, including Totò, Eduardo and Peppino De Filippo, Nino Taranto, Renato Rascel, Walter Chiari, Ugo Tognazzi, Macario, Alberto Sordi and Aldo Fabrizi. He concluded his career by signing many successful works interpreted by the comedy duo Franco and Ciccio. His last film was the western-parody  Two Sons of Ringo, in which just before the end of filming he was replaced by Giuliano Carnimeo for health reasons.

Selected filmography

Director 
 The Cuckoo Clock (1938)
 A Husband for the Month of April (1941)
 The Two Tigers (1941)
 Two Hearts Among the Beasts (1943)
 Eleven Men and a Ball (1948)
 The Transporter (1950)
 I'm the Capataz (1951)
 Auguri e figli maschi! (1951)
 La paura fa 90 (1951)
 I, Hamlet (1952)
 Passionate Song (1953)
 Saluti e baci (1953)
 Love Song (1954)
 It Happened at the Police Station (1954)
 Noi siamo due evasi (1959)
 Robin Hood and the Pirates (1960)
 Ursus in the Land of Fire (1961)
I due mafiosi (1964)
 Two Mafiamen in the Far West (1964)
 Two Mafiosi Against Goldfinger (1965)
 Two Sergeants of General Custer (1965)
 I due toreri (1965)
 Two Sons of Ringo (1966)

Screenwriter 
 The Song of Love (1930)
 Fountain of Trevi (1960)
 The Hot Port of Hong Kong (1962)

Film editor 
 The Blue Fleet (1932)
 Paradise (1932)
 La Wally (1932)
 Seconda B (1934)
 Loyalty of Love (1934)
 Don Bosco (1935)
 Golden Arrow (1935)
 Cavalry (1936)
 Queen of the Scala (1937)
 Mother Song (1937)
 Luciano Serra, Pilot (1938)
 The Widow (1939)
 Cardinal Messias (1939)
 No Man's Land (1939)
 A Thousand Lire a Month (1939)
 The Thrill of the Skies (1940)
 A Husband for the Month of April (1941)

References

External links 
 

1901 births
1966 deaths
Italian film directors
20th-century Italian screenwriters
Italian male screenwriters
Italian male non-fiction writers
Writers from Rome
Italian film editors
Italian film critics
20th-century Italian male writers
Italian parodists
Comedy film directors
Parody film directors